This is a list of the mammal species recorded in the Cayman Islands. There are the mammal species in the Cayman Islands, of which one is believed to be threatened.

The following tags are used to highlight each species' conservation status as assessed by the International Union for Conservation of Nature:

Subclass: Theria

Infraclass: Eutheria

Order: Sirenia (manatees and dugongs)

Sirenia is an order of fully aquatic, herbivorous mammals that inhabit rivers, estuaries, coastal marine waters, swamps, and marine wetlands. All four species are endangered.
Family: Trichechidae
Genus: Trichechus
West Indian manatee, T. manatus

Order: Chiroptera (bats)

The bats' most distinguishing feature is that their forelimbs are developed as wings, making them the only mammals capable of flight. Bat species account for about 20% of all mammals.

Family: Molossidae
Genus: Molossus
 Velvety free-tailed bat, Molossus molossus LC
Genus: Tadarida
 Mexican free-tailed bat, Tadarida brasiliensis LC
Family: Phyllostomidae
Subfamily: Phyllostominae
Genus: Macrotus
 Waterhouse's leaf-nosed bat, Macrotus waterhousii LC
Subfamily: Brachyphyllinae
Genus: Brachyphylla
 Cuban fruit-eating bat, Brachyphylla nana NT
Subfamily: Phyllonycterinae
Genus: Erophylla
 Buffy flower bat, Erophylla sezekorni LC
Subfamily: Stenodermatinae
Genus: Artibeus
 Jamaican fruit bat, Artibeus jamaicensis LC
Genus: Phyllops
 Cuban fig-eating bat, Phyllops falcatus LC
Family: Vespertilionidae
Genus: Eptesicus
 Big brown bat, Eptesicus fuscus LC

Order: Rodentia (Rodents)

Rodentia is an order of mammals characterised by two continuously growing incisors in the upper and lower jaws which must be kept short by gnawing. Rodents make up 40% of mammal species, and they are found in vast numbers on all continents other than Antarctica. Rodents have sharp incisors that they use to gnaw wood, break into food, and bite predators. Most eat seeds or plants, though some have more varied diets. Some species have historically been pests, eating seeds stored by people and spreading disease.

The name comes from the Latin word rodens, "gnawing one" (from the verb rodere, "gnaw").

In terms of number of species—although not necessarily in terms of number of organisms (population) or biomass—rodents make up the largest order of mammals. There are about 2,277 species of rodents (Wilson and Reeder, 2005), with over 40% of mammalian species belonging to the order.

The Central American agouti has been introduced to the Cayman Islands, and are found in forests, thick brush, savannas, and cultivated areas.

Family: Dasyproctidae
Genus: Dasyprocta
 Central American agouti, Dasyprocta punctata (I) LC

Order: Cetacea (whales)

The order Cetacea includes whales, dolphins and porpoises. They are the mammals most fully adapted to aquatic life with a spindle-shaped nearly hairless body, protected by a thick layer of blubber, and forelimbs and tail modified to provide propulsion underwater.

Suborder: Mysticeti
Family: Balaenopteridae (baleen whales)
Genus: Balaenoptera 
 Common minke whale, Balaenoptera acutorostrata
 Sei whale, Balaenoptera borealis
 Bryde's whale, Balaenoptera brydei
 Blue whale, Balaenoptera musculus
Genus: Megaptera
 Humpback whale, Megaptera novaeangliae
Suborder: Odontoceti
Superfamily: Platanistoidea
Family: Delphinidae (marine dolphins)
Genus: Delphinus
 Short-beaked common dolphin, Delphinus delphis DD
Genus: Feresa
 Pygmy killer whale, Feresa attenuata DD
Genus: Globicephala
 Short-finned pilot whale, Globicephala macrorhyncus DD
Genus: Lagenodelphis
 Fraser's dolphin, Lagenodelphis hosei DD
Genus: Grampus
 Risso's dolphin, Grampus griseus DD
Genus: Orcinus
 Killer whale, Orcinus orca DD
Genus: Peponocephala
 Melon-headed whale, Peponocephala electra DD
Genus: Pseudorca
 False killer whale, Pseudorca crassidens DD
Genus: Stenella
 Pantropical spotted dolphin, Stenella attenuata DD
 Clymene dolphin, Stenella clymene DD
 Striped dolphin, Stenella coeruleoalba DD
 Atlantic spotted dolphin, Stenella frontalis DD
 Spinner dolphin, Stenella longirostris DD
Genus: Steno
 Rough-toothed dolphin, Steno bredanensis DD
Genus: Tursiops
 Common bottlenose dolphin, Tursiops truncatus
Family: Physeteridae (sperm whales)
Genus: Physeter
 Sperm whale, Physeter catodon DD
Family: Kogiidae (dwarf sperm whales)
Genus: Kogia
 Pygmy sperm whale, Kogia breviceps DD
 Dwarf sperm whale, Kogia sima DD
Superfamily Ziphioidea
Family: Ziphidae (beaked whales)
Genus: Mesoplodon
 Gervais' beaked whale, Mesoplodon europaeus DD
Genus: Ziphius
 Cuvier's beaked whale, Ziphius cavirostris DD

Order: Carnivora (carnivorans)

There are over 260 species of carnivorans, the majority of which feed primarily on meat. They have a characteristic skull shape and dentition.
Suborder: Pinnipedia 
Family: Phocidae (earless seals)
Genus: Neomonachus
 Caribbean monk seal, Neomonachus tropicalis EX

Notes

References

See also
List of chordate orders
Lists of mammals by region
List of prehistoric mammals
Mammal classification
List of mammals described in the 2000s

Cayman Islands
Cayman Islands-related lists

Cayman Islands